György Alexits (5 January 1899 - 14 October 1978), born in Budapest, was a Hungarian mathematician.

References

Mathematicians from Budapest
1899 births
1978 deaths
Austro-Hungarian mathematicians